James Parker Landis (July 20, 1843 – December 1, 1924) was a United States soldier who was recognized with his nation's highest award for valor, the U.S. Medal of Honor, for his gallantry during the American Civil War. While serving as the Chief Bugler of the 1st Pennsylvania Cavalry/44th Pennsylvania Volunteers as part of the Union Army, he captured the enemy flag during the Battle of Amelia Springs at Paines Crossroads, Virginia on April 5, 1865.

Formative years
Born in Mifflin County, Pennsylvania on July 20, 1843, James Parker Landis was a son of Pennsylvania natives Martin and Mary Landis. Reared and educated in that county, he resided in the community of Lewistown in Derry Township in 1860 with his parents and older brother Joseph, who served as an apprentice plasterer to master plasterer and family patriarch Martin Landis.

Civil War
On August 18, 1861, Landis enrolled for Civil War military service at Lewistown, Pennsylvania. He then officially mustered in for duty at Washington on August 27 as a sergeant and bugler with Company C of the 1st Pennsylvania Cavalry (also known as the 44th Pennsylvania Volunteers). Military records at the time described him as being an 18-year-old plasterer from Mifflin County who was 5' 9-1/2" tall with black hair, black eyes and a dark complexion.

Transported with his regiment to Camp Jones near Washington, D.C. in August 1861, he and his fellow 1st Pennsylvania Cavalrymen were assigned to defensive duties there. Attached with his regiment to the Union's Army of the Potomac through April 1862 (McCall's Division through March and McDowell's I Corps through April), he and his regiment's first major engagement came in the Expedition to Dranesville beginning in late November 1861. After seeing action with the men from his company (C) and those from companies D, E, H, and I at Dranesville on December 20, he was stationed with the 1st Pennsylvania Cavalry at Camp Pierpont through March 1862. Participating with his regiment in the Advance on Manassas from March 10 to 15, he then engaged in McDowell's operations in and around Falmouth from April 9 to 19 of that year. Reassigned with his regiment to Bayard's Cavalry Brigade, which was attached to the Department of the Rappahannock (until June 1862), the Army of Virginia's III Corps (to September 1862) and the Army of the Potomac to June 1863, he fought with his regiment in the battles of Cross Keys, Virginia (June 8, 1862) and Cedar Mountain (August 9); Second Battle of Bull Run (August 28–30, 1862); battles of Antietam (September 17, 1862) and Fredericksburg (August 12–15, 1862); and Stoneman's 1863 Raid (April 13 to May 10, 1863).

During this latter phase of service, he was promoted from the rank of sergeant to Chief Bugler and transferred from C Company to his regiment's field and staff officers' corps on May 1, 1863. A month later, he was wounded while in service on June 9 in operations related to the Battle of Brandy Station. According to historian Samuel P. Bates:

Moving to Kelly's Ford, [the Union Army] crossed on the 9th of June, and was immediately engaged in the battle of Brandy Station.... At two P.M. the First and Fourth Divisions, under Buford, moved to Beverly Ford, and the Second and Third, under Gregg, to Kelly's Ford, where they bivouacked for the night. Crossing the river early on the following morning, Gregg moved out four miles to Stevensburg, where he left Colonel Duffy with the Second Division, to protect his flank, and proceeded with the Third Division to Brandy Station. The Second Brigade, composed of the First Pennsylvania, First New Jersey, and the First Maryland, under the command of Colonel Wyndham, took the advance.... On arriving at Brandy Station, the enemy opened with his artillery, which was promptly answered, and the first Maryland ... charged [while] Colonel Taylor led a desperate charge upon the left and rear of the foe, reaching the Barbour House, where were General Stuart, his staff, and body guard, surrounded by cavalry. Here a desperate encounter ensued, the men using the cavalrymen's true weapon, the sabre, with terrible effect. A number of prisoners were brought off.... At this point the enemy was heavily reinforced, and the command was obliged to withdraw.... The enemy failing to attack, Gregg moved toward Rappahannock Station, where he was again engaged, the First Pennsylvania supporting a battery. An artillery duel was kept up for nearly two hours, when Colonel Taylor was ordered to report, with his command, to General Buford, at Beverly Ford. Upon its arrival it was ordered to the extreme right, where it was hotly engaged.... The loss in this engagement was three killed and eleven severely wounded.

Marching two days later across the former battlefield of Bull Run, his regiment clashed again with Confederates — this time at Aldie on June 22. Assigned to guard the rear of the Union Army as it marched for Pennsylvania, the 1st Pennsylvania Cavalrymen reached the battlefield at Gettysburg during the morning of July 2, and were immediately assigned to duties at the headquarters of General George Meade for the remainder of the engagement before guarding the Union's reserve artillery as it made its way back from Pennsylvania into Maryland beginning July 5, 1863. Rejoining their brigade by mid-month, they next engaged the enemy near Shepardstown before withdrawing to Bolivar Heights. Encamped near Warrenton beginning July 27, they were assigned to guard, picket and scouting duties through mid-September when they joined other Union forces in re-engaging intensely with the enemy for three hours from Muddy Run to Culpepper on September 13, after which the 1st Pennsylvanians were sent out on skirmish assignments. Their next major engagements came in the Bristoe Campaign from October through November 1863, including the Battle of Bristoe Station (October 14), and the Mine Run Campaign in late November and early December.

Following the expiration of his initial term of service, he then re-enlisted on February 1, 1864, at Warrenton, Virginia. Next assigned to the Overland Campaign led by Union General Ulysses S. Grant, Landis and his fellow 1st Pennsylvania Cavalrymen fought in the battles of Haw's Shop (May 28), Cold Harbor (May 13 to June 12) and Trevilian Station (June 11–12) before engaging in the Siege of Petersburg through March 1865, which included the battles of First Battle of Deep Bottom/Gravel Hill (July 27–29, 1864). It was during this phase of service that Landis transferred to the 1st Pennsylvania Battery (on September 3, 1864).

After engaging with his regiment in the Battle of Five Forks on April 1, 1865, as part of the Appomattox Campaign, Landis then performed the act of gallantry for which he would later be awarded the U.S. Medal of Honor — capturing the enemy's flag while fighting with the 1st Pennsylvania in the Battle of Amelia Springs, Virginia on April 5. That act and the subsequent transfer of his captured enemy prize were briefly described by U.S. Secretary of War William C. Endicott in his February 16, 1888 report to the U.S. House of Representatives regarding the whereabouts of "flags, standards, and colors captured of the enemies of the United States":

Captured in battle at Farm's Cross Roads, April 5, 1865, by Sergeant James P. Landis, chief bugler First Pennsylvania Cavalry. First Brigade, Second Cavalry Division, Brevet Major-General Davies, commanding. Loaned to Brevet Major-General Davies, May __, by order of General Nichols, assistant adjutant-general.

Having survived the war through the surrender of the Confederate Army by General Robert E. Lee, Landis was finally discharged, honorably, by Special Order No. 312 on June 20, 1865.

Post-war life
Following his honorable discharge from the military, Landis returned home to Mifflin County, where he resumed his work as a plasterer and married. In 1870, he resided in Lewistown, Derry Township with his wife, Annie (born in Pennsylvania, circa 1841).

Sometime around 1889, Landis married Caroline E. (Heckman) Landis (1845–1922), a daughter of Benjamin Heckman. In 1910, he resided with her in Derry Township, where he was employed as a watchman for a local steel plant. Described once again as a house plasterer on the 1920 federal census, he was documented as residing in Lewistown's 5th Ward that year with "Carrie".

His second wife then preceded him in death, passing away in Lewistown on October 18, 1922. On October 1, 1924, he was awarded an increase in his U.S. Civil War Pension from $60 to $82 per month (made retroactive to August 1, 1923). His pension records during these years also documented that he was a Medal of Honor winner.

Landis was subsequently interred beside his wife at the Yeagertown Lutheran Cemetery in Mifflin County following his death at the age of 81 in that county's Derry Township on December 1, 1924.

Medal of Honor citation
Rank and organization: Chief Bugler, 1st Pennsylvania Cavalry. Place and date: At Paines Crossroads, Va., April 5, 1865. Entered service at: ------. Birth: Mifflin County, Pa. Date of issue: May 3, 1865.

Citation:
Capture of flag.

See also

List of Medal of Honor recipients
List of American Civil War Medal of Honor recipients: A–F
Musician (rank)
Pennsylvania in the American Civil War

References

External links
 "History of the Medal of Honor". Mt. Pleasant, South Carolina: Congressional Medal of Honor Society, retrieved online September 4, 2018.
 History of the First Reg't Pennsylvania Reserve Cavalry from Its Organization, August 1861, to September, 1864, with List of Names of All Officers and Enlisted Men Who Have Ever Belonged to the Regiment, and Remarks Attached to Each Name, Noting Change, &c. Philadelphia, Pennsylvania: King & Baird, Printers, 1864.
 "James Parker Landis" (memorial and gravesite information). Salt Lake City, Utah: Find A Grave, retrieved online, March 19, 2008.

1843 births
1924 deaths
United States Army Medal of Honor recipients
Union Army soldiers
People from Mifflin County, Pennsylvania
People of Pennsylvania in the American Civil War
American Civil War recipients of the Medal of Honor